Jon Barkman (born October 2, 1979) is a Canadian former professional ice hockey player.

Prior to turning professional, Barkman played major junior ice hockey in the Western Hockey League with the Saskatoon Blades and Prince George Cougars.

Awards and honours

References

External links

1979 births
Living people
Canadian ice hockey centres
Sportspeople from Steinbach, Manitoba
Idaho Steelheads (WCHL) players
Prince George Cougars players
Saskatchewan Huskies ice hockey players
Saskatoon Blades players
Toledo Storm players
Ice hockey people from Manitoba
People from Steinbach, Manitoba